Fredrick DuBois Bowman is an American statistician who is the Dean of the School of Public Health at the University of Michigan. His research applies statistical analysis to brain imaging to better understand Alzheimer's disease, schizophrenia and Parkinson's disease. Bowman is a member of the National Academy of Medicine, Fellow of the American Association for the Advancement of Science, and Fellow of the American Statistical Association.

Early life and education 
Bowman grew up in Ann Arbor, Michigan. He has said that he became interested in mathematics at a young age, and his teachers encouraged him academically. He earned his undergraduate degree at Morehouse College, where he majored in mathematics but also completed the pre-med requirements. He graduated magna cum laude in 1992 and was appointed to the Phi Beta Kappa honour society. During a conversation with Bill Jenkins, Bowman became excited by the possibility of a career that combined his interest in quantitative analysis with public health. He briefly joined the mathematical statistics program at Duke University before realising that he wanted to focus on biostatistics. He eventually moved to the University of Michigan to specialise in biostatistics, where he completed coursework in epidemiology and earned a master's degree in 1995. Whilst a graduate student Bowman taught trigonometry at the Washtenaw Community College. Bowman joined the University of North Carolina at Chapel Hill, where he worked toward a doctorate with Pranab K. Sen.

Research and career 
In 2000 Bowman joined Emory University as an assistant professor at the Rollins School of Public Health. He was promoted to Associate Professor with tenure in 2006 and Professor in 2013. In 2007 Bowman founded the Center for Biomedical Imaging Statistics. The field of neuroimaging was only just emerging whilst he was on the faculty at Emory, and psychiatrists realised that they would need a good grasp of statistics to make best of use of it.

In 2014 Bowman moved to the Columbia University Mailman School of Public Health where he was made Cynthia and Robert Citrone–Roslyn and Leslie Goldstein Professor. Here his work considered biostatistical approaches to better understand brain imaging data. Cynthia and Robert Citrone decided to fund the chair position after meeting Bowman and hearing about the impact of his research. In his time at Columbia University he considerably expanded the department education programmes in biostatistics as well as increasing the neuroimaging grant revenue. Here he served as a member of the Columbia University Data Science Institute.

Bowman was appointed Dean of the University of Michigan School of Public Health in 2018. His work looks to understand the environmental origins of neurological conditions, with a particular focus on early diagnosis of Parkinson's disease.

Awards and honours 
 2007 Emory University Woodruff Leadership Academy Fellow
 2008 University of North Carolina at Chapel Hill James Grizzle Distinguished Alumni Award
 2012 Elected Fellow of the American Statistical Association
 2013 President of the Eastern North American Region International Biometric Society
 2019 Morehouse College Bennie Trailblazer Award
 2019 Elected Fellow of the American Association for the Advancement of Science
 2020 American Statistical Association Black History Month Trailblazer
 2020 Elected as a member of the National Academy of Medicine

Selected publications

References 

Living people
Year of birth missing (living people)
American scientists
American statisticians
Members of the National Academy of Medicine
University of Michigan alumni
University of Michigan faculty
Morehouse College alumni
Emory University faculty
Columbia University faculty
Biostatisticians
People from Ann Arbor, Michigan